Sipe Sipe is a location in the Cochabamba Department in central Bolivia. It is the seat of the Sipe Sipe Municipality, the second municipal section of the Quillacollo Province.

History 
Sipe Sipe is a small town near which was fought the Battle of Sipe-Sipe. This decisive battle took place on 29 November 1815 and reestablished the control of Upper Peru to the Viceroyalty of Peru. As a consequence of this battle Upper Peru gained independence from Buenos Aires, and after the final defeat of Spain, Bolivia was born as a nation.

Population 
The evolution of the municipality population is as follows:
 1992: 19,132 inhabitants 
 2001: 31,337 inhabitants 
 2005: 37,978 inhabitants 
 2012: 41,571	 inhabitants

See also 
 Ch'aki Mayu

References 

  Instituto Nacional de Estadistica de Bolivia  (INE)

Populated places in Cochabamba Department